Iniistius brevipinnis is a species of marine ray-finned fish 
from the family Labridae, the wrasses. It is found in the Western Indian Ocean.  

References

brevipinnis
Taxa named by John Ernest Randall 
Fish described in 2013